Hortonia may refer to:

Places

United States
Hortonia, Vermont
Hortonia, Wisconsin

Plants
Hortonia, a genus including the following species:
H. angustifolia
H. floribunda
H. ovalifolia

See also
Horton (disambiguation)
Hortonville (disambiguation)